Woods–Meade House, is a historic home located at Rocky Mount, Franklin County, Virginia. The original section was built about 1830, and is the brick, one cell, front section.  It features a molded brick cornice, fine jack arches, and curious half-round brick pilasters and round brick porch supports. Later additions were made to the rear of the original section, starting in 1834.

The house is named for the original owner Robert T. Woods and for Morrison Meade who acquired it in 1834 and further developed it.

It was listed on the National Register of Historic Places in 1982.

References

External links
 Woods–Meade House, 140 Maple Street, Rocky Mount, Franklin County, Virginia, at the Historic American Buildings Survey (HABS)

Houses on the National Register of Historic Places in Virginia
Houses completed in 1830
Houses in Franklin County, Virginia
National Register of Historic Places in Franklin County, Virginia
Historic American Buildings Survey in Virginia
1830 establishments in Virginia